Pao Yi-min (12 September 1906 – 11 March 1993) was a Chinese politician. She was one of the first group of women elected to the Legislative Yuan in 1948.

Biography
Pao studied Chinese studies at Northeastern University. She joined the Kuomintang and became chair of the women's section in Andong Province. A member of the National Political Council, she was part of the Constitutional National Assembly that drew up the Constitution of the Republic of China. She was subsequently a candidate in the 1948 elections, in which she was elected to the Legislative Yuan. She subsequently relocated to Taiwan during the Chinese Civil War, where remained a member of parliament until 1991. She died in 1993

References

1906 births
Northeastern University (China) alumni
Members of the 1st Legislative Yuan
20th-century Chinese women politicians
Members of the Kuomintang
Members of the 1st Legislative Yuan in Taiwan
1993 deaths